Oingo Lake is one of several small lakes (the other including Runanga Lake and Potaka Lake) located northwest to the city of Hastings in the Hawke's Bay Region of the eastern North Island of New Zealand.

References

Hastings District
Lakes of the Hawke's Bay Region